The 2003 Ballon d'Or, given to the best football player in Europe as judged by a panel of sports journalists from UEFA member countries, was awarded to the Czech midfielder Pavel Nedvěd on 22 December 2003. On 11 November 2003, was announced the shortlist of 50 male players compiled by a group of experts from France Football. There were 52 voters, from Albania, Andorra, Armenia, Austria, Azerbaijan, Belarus, Belgium, Bosnia and Herzegovina, Bulgaria, Croatia, Cyprus, Czech Republic, Denmark, England, Estonia, Faroe Islands, Finland, France, Georgia, Germany, Greece, Hungary, Iceland, Israel, Italy, Kazakhstan, Latvia, Liechtenstein, Lithuania, Luxembourg, Macedonia, Malta, Moldova, the Netherlands, Northern Ireland, Norway, Poland, Portugal, Republic of Ireland, Romania, Russia, San Marino, Scotland, Slovakia, Slovenia, Spain, Sweden, Switzerland, Turkey, Ukraine, Wales and Yugoslavia. Each picked a first (5pts), second (4pts), third (3pts), fourth (2pts) and  fifth choice (1pt). 

Nedvěd was the second Czech player to win the award after Josef Masopust (1962). Gianluigi Buffon (Italy) was the top ranked goalkeeper in the list, at ninth place. Paolo Maldini (Italy) was the best ranked defender in third place, while Thierry Henry (France) was the top forward, at second place.

Rankings

Voted players

Non-voted players
The following 24 men were originally in contention for the 2003 Ballon d’Or, but did not receive any votes:

References

External links
 France Football Official website
 Rec.Sport.Soccer Statistics Foundation - "Ballon d'Or" 2003 voting results

2003
2003–04 in European football